Different may refer to:

Music
 Different (Thomas Anders album), 1989
 Different (Kate Ryan album), 2002
 "Different" (Band-Maid song), 2020
 "Different" (Robbie Williams song), 2012 
 "Different", a song by Acceptance from the 2005 album Phantoms
 "Different", a song by Burna Boy from the 2019 album African Giant
 "Different", a song by Cass Elliot from the soundtrack of the 1970 film Pufnstuf
 "Different", a song by Dreamscape from the 2007 album 5th Season
 "Different", a song by Egypt Central from the 2005 album Egypt Central
 "Different", a song by Future and Juice Wrld from the 2018 mixtape Wrld on Drugs
 "Different", a 2006 song by Jamie Shaw
 "Different", a 2017 song by Micah Tyler
 "Different", a song by No Malice from the 2013 album Hear Ye Him
 "Different", a song by Pendulum from the 2008 album In Silico
 "Different", a song by Winner from the 2014 album 2014 S/S
 "Different", a song by Ximena Sariñana from the 2011 album Ximena Sariñana

Other uses
 Different ideal, sometimes simply the different, in algebraic number theory

See also

 Difference (disambiguation)
 Different Strokes (disambiguation)
 Differential (disambiguation)
 Diffident, or shy